The idakka, also spelt edaykka/edakka, is an hourglass-shaped drum from Kerala in south India. This handy percussion instrument is very similar to the pan-Indian damaru. While the damaru is played by rattling knotted cords against the resonators, the idakka is played with a stick. Like the damaru, the idakka's pitch may be bent by squeezing the lacing in the middle. The idakka is slung over the left shoulder and the right side of the instrument is gently beaten with a thin curve-ended stick. It is played in temples and in performances such as Kathakali and Mohiniattam classical dance.

Etymology 
The Malayalam name idaykka or idakka is originated from the Sanskrit word श्रीढक्का (Śrīḍhakkā).  In Sanskrit, a ḍhakkā is described as a double drum which makes ḍhak sound. ढक् इति गम्भीरशब्देन कायतीति (ḍhak iti gambhīraśabdēna kāyatīti).  The sacred prefix Śrī is used to denote the auspiciousness of the instrument.

Construction 
Similar to the talking drum, The Idakka consists of two circular drum heads each of which is mounted within a circular ring. The hourglass-shaped body is placed between the two heads and lacing is used to pull the two rings towards each other, stretching each drum head over an open end of the body. Snare-like strings made of natural fiber are stretched across the open ends of the drum body, under each drum head. It is not uncommon for the diameter of the drum heads to be larger than the diameter of the body, with the result that the drum heads are often seen mounted significantly off-center.

Acoustics 

The Idakka is a small, high pitched drum with definite pitch. The snares running under the drum heads have been found to interact with the vibrating membrane in a way that causes the pitch of the instrument to be determinate. Different pitches can be obtained by squeezing the lacing around the instrument, which changes the amount of tension in the skins.

See also
 Damaru
 Pandi Melam
 Panchari melam
 Thayambaka
 Panchavadyam
 Tripunithura Krishnadas
 Talking Drum, another drum in West Africa with an hour-glass shape.

References

Arts of Kerala
Kathakali
Mohiniyattam
Drums
Membranophones
Indian musical instruments
Kerala music